Habbaniya can refer to:

Habbaniyah, a city in Iraq
Habbaniya tribe,  a Sudanese ethnic group
Lake Habbaniyah, a lake in Iraq
RAF Habbaniya, a military airbase